Fernando de Araújo or Fernando Araújo may refer to:
Fernando de Araújo (East Timorese politician) (1962–2015)
Fernando Araújo Perdomo (born 1955), Colombian politician
Fernando Araújo (footballer) (born 1972), Uruguayan football manager and former footballer